Sun Qinghai (born January 18, 1988, in Harbin, Heilongjiang) is a Chinese cross-country skier who has competed since 2006. He competed for China at the 2010 Winter Olympics in the team sprint and individual sprint events where he finished 19th and 21st, respectively.

At the FIS Nordic World Ski Championships 2007, Sun finished 48th in the sprint event while not finishing in the 30 km event.

His best World Cup finish was 25th in a sprint event in China

References

1988 births
Chinese male cross-country skiers
Cross-country skiers at the 2010 Winter Olympics
Cross-country skiers at the 2014 Winter Olympics
Cross-country skiers at the 2018 Winter Olympics
Living people
Olympic cross-country skiers of China
Cross-country skiers at the 2007 Asian Winter Games
Cross-country skiers at the 2017 Asian Winter Games
Asian Games silver medalists for China
Asian Games medalists in cross-country skiing
Medalists at the 2017 Asian Winter Games
Skiers from Harbin
Competitors at the 2015 Winter Universiade